Amorphoscelis angolica is a species of praying mantis found in Angola.

See also
List of mantis genera and species

References

Amorphoscelis
Fauna of Angola
Insects described in 1969